The Grupo de Operaciones Especiales (GOPES) was the tier 1 police tactical unit of the Federal Police of Mexico.

Specialization
Their mission was to carry out a variety of operations such as: 
Counter-narcotics and drug cartels
Counterterrorism
Executive protection
Fight organized crime.
Hostage rescue
Raiding for search and capture high-value targets.
Serving highly arrest dangerous criminals and search warrants.
Subduing suspects and engaging heavily-armed criminals.
Suppress insurgents in all terrains by infiltrating air, land, and water.

It had 87 members, divided into groups of 8 to 12 operators.

Training
The GOPES is a well-trained force which took courses from the following forces:
 : GAFE
 : Marine Airborne Battalion of the Mexican Navy
 : GEO
 : AFEUR
 : RAID
 : FAMS
 : BOPE

Firearms
 Assault rifle
 : FN SCAR
 : FN F2000
 : Beretta ARX-160
 : IMI Tavor
 : M4 carbine 

Grenade launcher
 : M203 grenade launcher
 : Milkor MGL

Machine guns
 : Heckler & Koch MG4
 : Browning M2
 : IMI Negev

SMG
 : Heckler & Koch MP5
 : Heckler & Koch UMP
 : Heckler & Koch MP7

Sniper rifle
 : Barret M82
 : Barret M98B
 : Remington 700
 : DSR-50

Shotguns
 : Remington 870
 : Benelli M4

Pistols
 : Heckler & Koch USP
 : Walther P99
 : Smith & Wesson Model 686
 : FN Five-seven
 : Beretta PX4 Storm
 : Beretta 92

External links
Official website (in Spanish)

Non-military counterterrorist organizations
Special forces of Mexico
Federal law enforcement agencies of Mexico